Frank Siffell   (1861 – 26 October, 1909) was a 19th-century Major League Baseball player. He played primarily catcher during the 1884 and 1885 seasons for the Philadelphia Athletics of the American Association.

Sources

1861 births
Date of birth unknown
1909 deaths
19th-century baseball players
Major League Baseball catchers
Philadelphia Athletics (AA) players
Major League Baseball players from Germany